Vettaiyaadu Vilaiyaadu is a 2006 Indian Tamil-language Neo noir  action crime thriller film written and directed by Gautham Vasudev Menon. The film stars Kamal Haasan, Jyothika, and Kamalinee Mukherjee in prominent roles, while Prakash Raj, Daniel Balaji, and Salim Baig played supporting roles. It revolves around a police officer who tries to track down two serial killers.

The music was composed by Harris Jayaraj with cinematography being handled by Ravi Varman and editing done by Anthony. The film is also one of the first Indian films to be made using Super 35. Vettaiyaadu Vilaiyaadu was released on 25 August 2006 to positive reviews and became a blockbuster at the box office. Kamal Haasan won the Tamil Nadu State Film Award for Best Actor. Jyothika was nominated for the Best Actress category at the Filmfare Awards.

Plot 
Rani, the daughter of former high-ranking Chennai police officer SP Arokiya Raj IPS, tells her father over the phone that she will be back home in Madurai in three hours. As Rani leaves the telephone booth, she is approached by someone she knows, and she does not come home. The following morning, Arokiya Raj finds Rani's finger hanging at his door. Arokiya Raj calls DCP Raghavan IPS, his ex-colleague and old friend from Chennai, to help in the investigation of Rani's disappearance. 

Raghavan finds Rani's body within 12 hours, buried in the outskirts of Madurai. The coroner's report states that the killer slit Rani's throat with a scalpel, proving that the murderer has a strong medical background, and also bisected her body with an axe. Without any solid clues, the case is left open. Six months following the trauma of losing their only daughter, Arokiya Raj and his wife Chithra move to New York City, to get away from the pain of losing Rani, and it was Rani's wish was to do her MS, there.

Three months later, Raghavan learns that both Arokiya Raj and Chithra have been brutally murdered in New York. Collaborating with the NYPD, Raghavan leaves for New York to represent the Indian police (IPS). On the flight, he reminisces about his late wife Kayalvizhi, who was abducted by a local gang in an attempt to get to him and fell to her death, so he killed the gang leader, who escaped captivity, as revenge. Once in New York, Raghavan begins his investigation with NYPD detective, Anderson. Raghavan stays at a hotel in downtown New York, where he constantly keeps his superiors in Chennai updated on the investigation. 

At the hotel, he meets his neighbour Aradhana, an NRI. He immediately notices that she is going through a rough patch in her life and one night, worried about her safety, breaks into her room, only to find her attempting suicide, by asphyxiation. He saves her life and the two strike a friendship. Aradhana reveals that her violent husband, Arun, is filing for divorce, after cheating on her. Later, Raghavan and Anderson find a connection between Rani's murder in Madurai and a two-year-old unsolved disappearance of an Indian American girl, Chandana, whose finger was also possibly found hanging in her boyfriend Hitesh's car. 

Raghavan's instinct leads them to Chandana's body in a restricted area in the suburbs, found along with three other American women, murdered in a similar manner. After narrowing down their suspects using flight records, their suspicion falls onto two Indian doctors who studied in Brooklyn Medical University: Amudhan Sukumaran and Ilamaaran Aanandhan, who are secretly involved in the killings. They murder their former professor, Veronica, along with two NYPD officers in the same area, where Raghavan set them on surveillance, and leave the bodies there. Raghavan and Anderson visit Amudhan and Ilamaaran's apartment to question them, only to find it unoccupied. Raghavan and Anderson break into the apartment and find pictures of the victims and the murder weapons, thus cracking their case. 

Before they can call for backup, Ilamaaran arrives, unannouncedand, and shoots Anderson in the head, with a gun. Enraged, Raghavan hits him till he becomes unconscious. Right afterwards, Raghavan gets stabbed by Amudhan, with a scalpel. To buy time, Raghavan asks Amudhan why such intelligent young men, like them, would succumb to such psychopathic and heinous acts. Amudhan explains that they had developed a habit of killing from their childhood itself, starting with pushing a classmate from a train, at the age of 13, to murdering their school teacher, at the age of 17. He says that he and Amudhan stopped this activity once they joined MBBS, at Rani's college. 

Amudhan claims that he managed to keep his violent urges under control for three years, but when he saw Rani, he tried to assault and kill her, after she provoked him. Illamaran calmed him down and two days later, Arokiyaraj assaulted the duo, outside a theatre. He and Ilamaaran were locked up in the local station for the rest of the night, but Inspector Kumar, neglected to interrogate them and tortured them heavily, even setting them up with a eunuch, who inadvertently assaulted them. Albeit thirsty for revenge, both of them left for New York to pursue their higher studies in surgery and went on to abduct and kill local young women, who looked down on them or were disrespectful to them.

On their trip to India, they met and killed Rani and returned to the States. Once they found out that Arokiya Raj and his wife had moved to New York, they studied their residence and killed them too. Thinking that Raghavan will be dead in minutes due to his lung injuries, they set their apartment on fire and take the next flight to Mumbai, to escape the NYPD. Raghavan makes it out alive by jumping out the window and is hospitalised with severe injuries. Aradhana takes care of him, and their bond grows stronger. Four weeks later, Raghavan and Aradhana return to Chennai together. During their flight, Aradhana explains that she has a daughter who is living with her parents in Chennai, and upon realisation, she feels guilty for being selfish and wanting to commit suicide. 

Aradhana states that she will be taking her daughter and mother back to New York in two weeks, to start her job. As they wait in line for customs, Raghavan proposes to Aradhana, but she refuses, saying that she is not ready for another relationship, having just finalised her divorce, and wishes to focus on being a good mother to her daughter. Amudhan and Ilamaran, evade the Mumbai police at the airport and finally reach Chennai, leaving a trail of bodies in their path. Raghavan issues a state-wide hunt for them. The dean of their medical college also revokes their degrees, thus beginning their violent rampage. 

After seeing Aradhana with Raghavan, Amudhan kidnaps her, while Ilamaaran tries to get into Raghavan's house to kill him. When the cops arrive, Ilamaaran attempts to flee, but is caught by Raghavan, after a long road chase. Raghavan comes to realise that Amudhan and Ilamaaran are in an intimate relationship. Trying to negotiate Ilamaaran's freedom for Aradhana's, Raghavan agrees to meet with Amudhan; on the other hand, Amudhan decides to outright bury Aradhana alive, after realising their hypocrisy. The final altercation results in Raghavan killing both Amudhan and Ilamaaran and rescuing Aradhana. A few months later, Raghavan and Aradhana get married in presence of their friends and family.

Cast 

 Kamal Haasan as DCP Raghavan IPS.
 Jyothika as Aradhana (Voiceover by Rohini)
 Kamalinee Mukherjee as Kayalvizhi (Voiceover by Andrea Jeremiah)
 Lev Gorn as Anderson
 Prakash Raj as SP Arokiya Raj IPS
 Rajashree as Chithra
 Bidushi Dash Barde as Rani
 Daniel Balaji as Amudhan Sukumaran
 Salim Baig as Ilamaaran Aanandhan (Voiceover by Gautham Vasudev Menon)
 Yog Japee as Arun
 Ahuti Prasad as Commissioner of Chennai
 Janaki Sabesh as Aradhana's mother
 Ganesh as Dharma
 Mumaith Khan (item number in Neruppae Sikki Mukki Song)
 Sunny Veer Singh (item number in Neruppae Sikki Mukki Song)
 Zabyn Khan (item number in Neruppae Sikki Mukki Song)
 Stun Siva as "Royapuram" Mani (special appearance)
 Rajeevan as Hitesh (special appearance)
 Gautham Vasudev Menon in a special appearance in the song "Manjal Veyil"
 Dr.Kantharaj as a himself in a special appearance
 Rajendran as a henchman in "Karka Karka"
 Vettai Muthukumar as a rogue in "Karka Karka" (Uncredited)

Production 
In 2005, Gautham Vasudev Menon planned to make a film in Malayalam (which eventually became Vettaiyaadu Vilaiyaadu) and approached Mohanlal after finishing the script, but nothing materialised. Kamal Haasan had agreed to make a film for producer Kaja Mohideen of Roja Combines, and the pair discussed signing Menon to be the director after they were impressed with his work in Kaakha Kaakha (2003). Initially, Haasan narrated the script of Dasavathaaram (2008) to Menon and asked him to direct it, but the latter rejected it. Later, Menon discussed the script of Pachaikili Muthucharam (2007) with Haasan, and the actor asked him to develop it into a script within forty days. However, he later had second thoughts and asked Menon for a different script to collaborate on. Menon was keen to make a trilogy of police films, much like Ram Gopal Varma's gangster trilogy, and subsequently planned Vettaiyaadu Vilaiyaadu as the second in the series after Kaakha Kaakha. The film narrated another episode from a police officer's life, that of an Indian police officer who moves to America to investigate the case of psychotic serial killers before returning to pursue the chase in India. As per Menon's usual method for picking a title, he asked his associates for suggestions, which included the title of Thadayaara Thaaka, which was later used for another film. An early working title for the film was Sippai.

The film began production in August 2005 in Chennai, with Ravi Varman signed as the cinematographer. Towards the start of the shoot, producer Kaja Mohideen ran into financial troubles and subsequently attempted suicide. As a result, Haasan wanted to quit the project but Menon convinced him to stay on as they had taken advance payments. Ravichandran of Oscar Films stepped in and spent  on the film, before also suddenly withdrawing from the project within fifteen days. In order not to waste dates, Menon personally funded a schedule in Mumbai featuring Haasan and Jyothika and spent . Menon revealed that unlike Haasan's other films, the actor did not want to take control of the script or production. Angered by the delays of the film, he kept to himself and made minimal suggestions barring to change some dialogues on location. The film however had gone through changes from the original script, with less emphasis on the antagonists than Menon had hoped, and he also revealed that scenes for songs were forced and shot without him.

For the American schedule, Manickam Narayanan took over as a producer and made the film on a "first-copy" basis. Subsequently, fifty per cent of the film was shot in New York City, where shooting lasted for a month. Menon had planned to shoot more scenes in the city, including a car chase sequence, but the change of producer delayed the schedule and cold weather elongated the team's stay and increased costs. Actresses Rohini and Andrea Jeremiah dubbed for the voices of female leads Jyothika and Kamalinee Mukherjee respectively. Ganesh Janardhanan, who later became popularly known as VTV Ganesh, portrayed the role of the kidnapper of Mukherjee's character at Haasan's request after the original actor failed to turn up for the shoot. Menon worked on the post-production of the film in May 2006, while he was simultaneously filming Pachaikili Muthucharam.

Themes and influences 
Like in Kaakha Kaakha, Menon wanted the script to feature sequences where that the police officer's personal life gets involved and affected in the course of the investigation.

Music 
The soundtrack of the film consists of five songs composed by Harris Jayaraj, collaborating with Menon and Haasan for the fourth and first time respectively. The song "Manjal Veyil" marks Krish's singing debut. The film remains Jayaraj's only collaboration with Haasan.

Behindwoods wrote a positive review, stating: "The album has not let down expectations. It is the usual mix by Harris. However, Bombay Jeyashree's contribution and the beautiful lyrics by poetess Thamarai are the greatest assets to the album. Harris once again proves his mastery in orchestration and the audio will surely be a hit like Minnale or Kaakha Kaakha."

Release

Critical response 
Baradwaj Rangan summarised it in his review: "The story of a police investigation is detailed in a smart, grown-up movie that gets most things right." He praised the film for "giving us a sense of a day in the life of a cop as if an invisible crew followed him around as he went about his job." He lavished heavy praise on Gautham Menon for the mature handling of the relationship between the lead pair, saying, "Gautham continues to dream up for Jyotika parts that no one's imagined her in before, and she contributes to the kind of mature romantic angle we've rarely seen before. It's not just about boy meeting girl and falling in love; it's about a boy with baggage meeting girl with bigger baggage and tentatively exploring the practicality of a new relationship after their respective old ones have faded away." Behindwoods said, "It is definitely a triumph of sorts for Gautham and Manickam Narayanan, who have gone through innumerable hitches in getting the movie released. Enjoy!!" Rediff.com gave it 3.5/5, saying "In his best performance in recent times, Kamal portrays the character with believable honesty and charm." Sify stated that "what gives you goose flesh is the finely calibrated performance of Kamal as DCP Raghavan. You just [can't] take your eyes off him as he laces his portrayal with dignity, grace and dry wit."

Box office 
Vettaiyaadu Vilaiyaadu emerged the biggest Tamil blockbuster of the year grossing a total of 500 million worldwide.

Accolades 
Tamil Nadu State Film Awards

 Best Actor – Kamal Haasan
 Best Cinematographer – Ravi Varman

Film Fans Association Award

 Best Actor – Kamal Haasan
 Best Director – Gautham Vasudev Menon
 Best Music Director – Harris Jayaraj
 Best Playback Singer – Unni Menon
 Best Cinematographer – Ravi Varman

Filmfare Awards South

 Best Actor – Kamal Haasan (Nominated)
 Best Actress – Jyothika (Nominated)
 Best Music Director – Harris Jayaraj (Nominated)

Potential sequel
At the audio launch of Vendhu Thanindhathu Kaadu, Kamal Haasan asserted the possibility of a sequel to Vettaiyaadu Vilaiyaadu.

References

External links 
 

2000s police procedural films
2000s Tamil-language films
2006 films
2006 LGBT-related films
Fictional portrayals of the Tamil Nadu Police
Films about rape in India
Films directed by Gautham Vasudev Menon
Films scored by Harris Jayaraj
Films set in Chennai
Films set in Goa
Films set in Kerala
Films set in Mumbai
Films set in Washington, D.C.
Films shot in Goa
Films shot in New Jersey
Films shot in New York (state)
Films shot in Tirunelveli
Indian action thriller films
Indian detective films
Indian films set in New York City
Indian LGBT-related films
Indian nonlinear narrative films
Indian serial killer films
Foreign films set in the United States